The National High School Rodeo Association (NHSRA), based in Denver, Colorado, was incorporated in 1961 to promote interest in rodeo sports among high school students, to provide training, and to establish venues for their performances.

It began in 1947 as a single organization in Texas (National Championship High School Rodeo Association), and has grown to include local organizations in most U.S. states and in Canada, Mexico, Australia, and New Zealand. It has over 12,000 members and sanctions over 1,800 rodeos every year.

The NHSRA holds a finals rodeo every year, changing locations every two years, and awards championships in both girls and boys events.
Girls events: all-around cowgirl, barrel racing, breakaway roping, pole bending, goat tying, ((rodeo queen)), team roping, girls cutting horse, and working cow horse.
Boys events: all-around cowboy, tie down (calf) roping, steer wrestling, bareback riding, saddle bronc riding, bull riding, team roping, boys cutting horse, and working cow horse.
Coed events: team roping
In addition to high school students, the NHSRA provides similar services for junior high school age students, but with some events unique to this division: boy's chute dogging, boys breakaway roping and goat tying. The Junior division showcases the only event which must have one girl and one boy: ribbon roping.

National, State, and Provincial organizations

Australia

Visit the Australian High School Rodeo website:

Australian High School Rodeo Association

Canada
Canada has five provincial NHSRA organizations.
Alberta - 
British Columbia - 
Manitoba - 
Ontario - 
Saskatchewan

United States
The United States has forty-three state NHSRA organizations.
Alabama - 
Alaska - 
Arizona - 
Arkansas - 
California - 
Colorado - 
Florida - 
Georgia - 
Hawaii - 
Idaho - 
Illinois - 
Indiana - 
Iowa - 
Kansas - 
Kentucky - 
Louisiana -
Maryland - 
Michigan - 
Minnesota - 
Mississippi - 
Missouri - 
Montana - 
Nebraska - 
Nevada - 
New Jersey -
New Mexico - 
New York-
North Carolina - 
North Dakota - 
Ohio - 
Oklahoma - 
Oregon - 
Pennsylvania - 
South Carolina - 
South Dakota - 
Tennessee - 
Texas - 
Utah - 
Virginia - 
Washington - 
West Virginia - 
Wisconsin - 
Wyoming

See also
Rodeo bareback rigging

References

External links
Official website
 rodeo pioneer

Rodeo organizations
Youth organizations based in the United States
Youth organizations based in Canada
Youth organisations based in Australia
Sports competitions in Denver